The Shelby Dakota was a limited-production performance version of the Dodge Dakota Sport pickup truck.  Offered by Shelby for 1989 only, it was his first rear-wheel drive vehicle in many years.

The Shelby Dakota started with a short-wheelbase, short-bed, standard-cab pickup. The 3.9 L V6 was removed in favor of the company's 5.2 L V8 with throttle-body injection. On paper, the swap looked simple since both engines were similar, but the tight space in the Dakota's engine compartment meant removing the engine-driven fan in front and using electric ones instead.

Special wheels and trim, as well as individually numbered dash plaques proclaimed the car's heritage.  At the time, it was the highest-performing pickup truck in existence, except for the Dodge Li’l Red Express Truck, and would set the stage for later factory efforts like the GMC Syclone and Ford Lightning.  Total Production: 1500. 505 in white and 995 in red. 1 was made in two-tone with red below the stripe and white above the stripe. List price was $15,813 plus freight.

References

 Shelby Dakota page at Allpar.com

Dakota
Rear-wheel-drive vehicles
Pickup trucks
Cars introduced in 1989